Dibenzoylhydrazine (DBH) is a synthetic chemical compound with the chemical formulation C14H12N2O2. It is sometimes known as a benzoic acid amine, and is related to benzoyl peroxide, tricarban, isocarboxazid, and hydrazine. The substance was patented as an "ecdysone receptor ligand-binding domain structure" on 9 December 2004 by Michael C. Lawrence and nine others at the Australian CSIRO, and since 1991 it had been known to be effective in compound form against insect pests of the orders Lepidoptera, Coleoptera, and Hemiptera.

Tebufenozide, methoxyfenozide and halofenozide are classed as commercial DBHs.

In 2013, a compound of the substance was tested with promising results against larvae of Anopheles gambiae, the major vector for human malaria.

References

Insecticides
Hydrazides